Onyankopon may refer to:

 An alternative name for Nyame, the God of the Akan people of Ghana
 Onyankopon, a character in the manga series Attack on Titan
 Onyankopon, winner of the 2022 Keisei Stakes